The 2010 FC Rostov season was the second successive season that the club played in the Russian Premier League, the highest tier of football in Russia, during which they finished 9th.

Squad

Transfers

Winter

In:

Out:

Summer

In:

Out:

Competitions

Overview

Premier League

Results by round

Results

League table

Russian Cup

The Quarterfinal took place during the 2011–12 season.

Squad statistics

Appearances and goals

|-
|colspan="14"|Players away from Rostov on loan:

|-
|colspan="14"|Players who appeared for Rostov but left during the season:

|}

Goal Scorers

Clean sheets

Disciplinary record

References

FC Rostov seasons
Rostov